U.S. Highway 12 (US 12 or Highway 12) in the U.S. state of Wisconsin runs east–west across the western to southeast portions of the state. It enters from Minnesota running concurrently with Interstate 94 (I-94) at Hudson, parallels the Interstate to Wisconsin Dells, and provides local access to cities such as Menomonie, Eau Claire, Black River Falls, Tomah, and Mauston. It then provides an alternative route for traffic between northwestern Wisconsin and Madison and is the anchor route for the Beltline Highway around Madison. Finally, it serves southeastern Wisconsin, connecting Madison with Fort Atkinson, Whitewater, Elkhorn, and Lake Geneva. The West Beltline Highway and the segment between Elkhorn and Genoa City are freeways, and the segment between Sauk City and Middleton is an expressway. The remainder of the road is a two-lane surface road or an urban multilane arterial. Between Hudson and west of Warrens, the road closely parallels the former main line of the Chicago, St. Paul, Minneapolis and Omaha Railway, now operated by Union Pacific Railroad.

Route description

Hudson to Lake Delton
US 12 crosses the St. Croix River from Minnesota concurrent with I-94 into St. Croix County. The highway crosses WIS 65 in Roberts and passes through Hammond over a  segment to Baldwin, where it crosses US 63. Roughly  into Dunn County, US 12 passes through Knapp then turns southeastward, connecting with WIS 79  further; it then joins WIS 25 (North Broadway Street) to the south in Menomonie. US 12 turns east onto WIS 29 (Main Street East) in downtown Menomonie, and the two routes follow Stout Road east out of the city. The highways meet an interchange with I-94, then split one half of a mile east in Elk Mound at the junction with WIS 40. US 12 passes through Elk Mound and enters Eau Claire County.

US 12 merges with WIS 312 east (North Crossing) for  before turning south onto Clairemont Avenue, bypassing downtown Eau Claire to the south and west. WIS 37 joins with US 12 on the southwest side of the city. Access to WIS 93 is provided via US 53. The interchange between US 12 and US 53 in Altoona is Wisconsin's first single-point urban interchange. US 12 continues east out of the Eau Claire–Chippewa Falls metropolitan area and passes through Fall Creek, where it turns southeastward to join WIS 27 south in Augusta. The two highways briefly join US 10 on the Jackson County line in Fairchild. US 12 and WIS 27 turn southward and pass through Humbird in Clark County and into Jackson County.

US 12 and WIS 27 cross WIS 95 in Merrillan and WIS 54 in Black River Falls. US 12 and WIS 27 also split in Black River Falls. US 12 follows I-94 to the southeast past Millston and into Monroe County. The highway crosses I-94 (with no access) south of Kirby and junctions with WIS 21 on the north side of Tomah at an interchange with the Interstate. US 12 passes through Tomah and joins with WIS 16 on the south side at the junction with WIS 131 near Mill Bluff State Park. The highways continue paralleling I-90 and I-94 southeast and pass through Oakdale and into Juneau County.

US 12 and WIS 16 pass through Camp Douglas and cross WIS 80 in New Lisbon. The highways then junction with WIS 58 and WIS 82 in Mauston as they continue southeast. The routes trek eastward and pass through Lyndon Station, where Rocky Arbor State Park is located. The highways turn southeast again and cross the Interstates into Sauk County and Wisconsin Dells. WIS 16 turns east onto WIS 13 north as WIS 23 west turns south onto US 12. These highways follow the Wisconsin Dells Parkway south into the heart of the Wisconsin Dells tourism district, passing such attractions as Noah's Ark Water Park, the Wisconsin Ducks boat tours, Kalahari Resort, Mt. Olympus Water & Theme Park, Wilderness Territory, and Tommy Bartlett Show. WIS 23 turns west onto Monroe Avenue as US 12 turns southeast and crosses the Interstates.

Lake Delton to Cambridge

At the I-90/94 interchange, US 12 becomes a freeway that bypasses Baraboo that goes just south of the Grasser Road overpass. The highway becomes an expressway just north of Lehman Road and remains so until a few miles north of Sauk City. WIS 60 briefly joins US 12 in Sauk City and WIS 78 crosses the Wisconsin River concurrently with US 12 into Dane County. US 12 becomes an expressway again at the county line and continues southeast, crossing WIS 19 at Springfield Corners. Just northwest of Middleton, the route becomes a freeway as it enters the Madison area along the West Beltline Highway.

US 12 merges with US 14 at University Avenue. The freeway continues south and turns eastward at the interchange with County Trunk Highway M (CTH-M) and CTH-S (Mineral Point Road). US 18 and US 151 join the beltline off Verona Road in southwestern Madison. The four-way concurrency was crossed by a railroad track at the surface until 2007. The crossing was isolated using Jersey barriers until that time. The freeway also had several ramps, which contained driveways that accessed businesses. US 12 and US 18 continue east into Monona and cross the Upper Mud Lake channel. The highways meet US 51 at Stoughton Road, then interchange with I-39 and I-90 on the southeast side of Madison. US 12 and US 18 continue as an expressway east of the Interstates, junctioning with WIS 73 in Deerfield and splitting, with US 12 turning southeast into Jefferson County in Cambridge.

Cambridge to Genoa City
After leaving Cambridge, US 12 passes through Oakland and crosses WIS 26, WIS 89, and WIS 106 in Fort Atkinson. WIS 89 joins US 12 as the route turns southward to approach Whitewater, bypassing the city to the south into Walworth County. The route briefly enters Rock County before crossing into Walworth County. WIS 89 turns off US 12 at its junction with WIS 59. WIS 59 East follows US 12 briefly before turning north into the city. US 12 passes through La Grange and turns south at the junction with WIS 20 to follow WIS 67 south. US 12 turns southeast off WIS 67 onto a freeway northeast of Elkhorn. The highway crosses over WIS 11 with no access (although access is provided via nearby I-43), then interchanges with I-43. Access for Lake Geneva is provided at WIS 120 and WIS 50 as US 12 passes the city to the east. The highway turns south into Genoa City, where the freeway ends and US 12 follows the crossroad into Illinois.

History
The entire route was originally signed as WIS 12 in 1917 prior to the creation of the U.S. Numbered Highway System in 1926. Aside from changes resulting from the construction of freeways and US 12 being aligned on them, some differences exist between the original route and today's alignment. WIS 12 followed CTH-E, a more southerly alignment, between Menomonie and Eau Claire. From Black River Falls, WIS 12 continued south to Shamrock and turned east to follow CTH-O to Millston. WIS 12 ran southerly from Tomah along WIS 131 to CTH-A and turned east onto the county road to pass through Hustler and Clifton to reach New Lisbon.

The state originally planned to upgrade all of US 12 from Genoa City to Madison to freeway in anticipation of Illinois facilitating a toll road south of the state line. However, after Wisconsin started upgrading between Elkhorn and Genoa City, it was realized that the upgrades on the Illinois side had been shelved due to community and environmental opposition.

The route between Cambridge and Whitewater was upgraded to a straighter and flatter path for safety.  A bypass of Whitewater was added in 2005, although the bypass is currently only two lanes.  Upgrades to US 12 between Middleton and Sauk City were completed in 2005, but local opposition prevented most of the remaining route north of that point to Lake Delton from being constructed.

In Wisconsin, the highway was designated as the Iron Brigade Memorial Highway in 1993 to honor the Civil War Union Army unit; it also has this designation in Michigan, Indiana, and Illinois.

Major intersections

Related routes

See also

References

External links

 Wisconsin
12
Transportation in St. Croix County, Wisconsin
Transportation in Dunn County, Wisconsin
Transportation in Eau Claire County, Wisconsin
Transportation in Jackson County, Wisconsin
Transportation in Clark County, Wisconsin
Transportation in Monroe County, Wisconsin
Transportation in Juneau County, Wisconsin
Transportation in Sauk County, Wisconsin
Transportation in Dane County, Wisconsin
Transportation in Jefferson County, Wisconsin
Transportation in Walworth County, Wisconsin